Motor torpedo boat tender is a type of ship used by the U.S. Navy during World War II and Vietnam War. The motor torpedo boat tender's task was to act as a tender in remote areas for patrol boats (PT-boats) and to provide the necessary fuel and provisions for the torpedo boats she was responsible for. The type finds its root in the torpedo boat tender, developed in the 19th century.

This type of ship was classified as "AGP" and is sometimes called a "patrol craft tender."

See also 
 example with a description of the functioning of this type of vessel

References 

Ship types
Auxiliary ships
World War II auxiliary ships of the United States
Auxiliary ship classes of the United States Navy